Yuriy Kostiantynovych Kutenko (8 July 1932 – 13 December 2003) was a Ukrainian decathlete. He competed at the 1956 and 1960 Summer Olympics and placed fourth in 1960; he also finished fourth at the 1954 European Championships. Kutenko was seriously injured during a 1963 Soviet-American meetup in San Francisco, breaking several ribs and spending 40 days in a hospital. The accident left him with a failed kidney and forced him to retire. He later had a two-decade-long career as an athletics coach with the Soviet Army Sports Club.

References

1932 births
2003 deaths
People from Fastiv
Olympic athletes of the Soviet Union
Athletes (track and field) at the 1956 Summer Olympics
Athletes (track and field) at the 1960 Summer Olympics
Ukrainian decathletes
Soviet decathletes
Sportspeople from Kyiv Oblast